The Zempoaltepec deer mouse (Habromys lepturus) also known as the slender-tailed deer mouse, is a species of rodent in the family Cricetidae.

It is endemic to southeastern Mexico, at one locality on Cerro Zempoaltepec above , in the Sierra Madre de Oaxaca in Oaxaca state.

References

Musser, G. G. and M. D. Carleton. 2005. Superfamily Muroidea. pp. 894–1531 in Mammal Species of the World a Taxonomic and Geographic Reference. D. E. Wilson and D. M. Reeder eds. Johns Hopkins University Press, Baltimore.

Habromys
Endemic mammals of Mexico
Rodents of North America
Fauna of the Sierra Madre de Oaxaca
Mammals described in 1898
Critically endangered biota of Mexico
Critically endangered fauna of North America
Taxonomy articles created by Polbot
Taxa named by Clinton Hart Merriam